Super Blues is a 1967 studio album by a blues supergroup consisting of Bo Diddley, Muddy Waters, and Little Walter. The album was released in both mono and stereo formats by Checker Records in June 1967. A follow-up album The Super Super Blues Band was released later that year and featured Howlin' Wolf replacing Little Walter.

Background
The album was produced by Ralph Bass for Chess Records, although Marshall and Phil Chess were present at the sessions and were credited with supervision. The album's recording engineers were Doug Brand and Ron Malo.

The song featured on the album were several of the musicians most famous songs includes Bo Diddley's "I'm a Man", Muddy Waters' "I Just Want to Make Love to You", and Little Walter's "My Babe".

Track listings

Original album
Side one
"Long Distance Call" (McKinley Morganfield) – 5:15
"Who Do You Love?" (Ellas McDaniel) – 4:10
"I'm a Man" (Elias McDaniel) – 5:40
"Bo Diddley" (Elias McDaniel) – 4:35

Side two
"You Can't Judge A Book By Its Cover" (Willie Dixon) – 4:25
"I Just Want to Make Love to You" (Willie Dixon) – 6:07
"My Babe" (Willie Dixon) – 3:52
"You Don't Love Me (You Don't Care)" (Elias McDaniel) – 4:05

1992 Bonus Tracks
"Studio Chatter" (Elias McDaniel) – 1:27
"Sad Hours" (Walter Jacobs) – 5:09
"Juke" (Walter Jacobs) – 3:31

Personnel
''Per liner notes
Bo Diddley – vocals, guitar
Muddy Waters – vocals, guitar
Little Walter – vocals, harmonica
Sonny Wimberley – bass guitar
Frank Kirkland – drums
Buddy Guy – guitar
Otis Spann – piano
Cookie Vee – tambourine, vocals
Technical
Ralph Bass – producer
Ron Malo – engineer
Doug Brand – engineer
Don Bronstein – cover design
Leslie Sims – cover art
Vartan – reissue art direction

References

Checker Records albums
1967 albums
Muddy Waters albums
Bo Diddley albums
Little Walter albums
Albums produced by Ralph Bass
Collaborative albums